Jerzy Kaczkowski (16 May 1938 in Warsaw - 14 July 1988 in Warsaw) was a Polish weightlifter. He was born in Warsaw. Among his achievements was a fourth place at the 1964 Summer Olympics, and a bronze medal at the 1965 World Championships.

References

External links

1938 births
1988 deaths
Polish male weightlifters
Olympic weightlifters of Poland
Weightlifters at the 1964 Summer Olympics
Sportspeople from Warsaw
20th-century Polish people